Charles J. Leeds was the 37th mayor of New Orleans (November 30, 1874 – December 19, 1876).

Leeds was a member of the white supremacist organization White League and had furnished its members with artillery and small arms during their insurrection against the elected government in the so-called Battle of Liberty Place in 1874.

External links
 Charles J. Leeds administration on New Orleans Public Library site

Citations

Mayors of New Orleans